Belisa is a 1966 opera in four scenes by Poul Rovsing Olsen. It is one of at least six operas based on Lorca's Amor de don Perlimplín con Belisa en su jardín.

Recording
Belisa -  Eir Inderhaug, Sten Byriel, Marianne Rørholm, Anne Margrethe Dahl, Lise-Lotte Nielsen, Elisabeth Halling Vocal Group Ars Nova, Odense Symphony Orchestra, Tamás Vető

References

Operas
1966 operas
Danish-language operas